Guillaume Faivre (born 20 February 1987) is a Swiss former professional football goalkeeper. He played his entire career in Switzerland and is mostly known for his time at FC Thun, before he ended his career at BSC Young Boys in the Swiss Super League on 30 March 2022.

References

Living people
1987 births
Footballers from Bern
Swiss men's footballers
Association football goalkeepers
Swiss Super League players
Swiss Challenge League players
Neuchâtel Xamax FCS players
FC Vaduz players
Swiss expatriate footballers
Swiss expatriate sportspeople in Liechtenstein
Expatriate footballers in Liechtenstein
FC Wil players
FC Thun players
BSC Young Boys players